Jennifer is a 1953 drama film directed by Joel Newton and starring Ida Lupino, Howard Duff, and Robert Nichols. The film is notable for the introduction of the jazz standard "Angel Eyes," composed and performed by Matt Dennis.

Plot
Down on her luck, Agnes Langley (Ida Lupino) is hired by Lorna Gale (Mary Shipp) to replace the "missing" Jennifer as caretaker for the Gale family's currently unoccupied Southern California estate. Agnes is immediately affected by the mysterious house and, after she finds a diary apparently belonging to Jennifer, becomes obsessed with determining the cause of the woman's "disappearance".

Cast
 Ida Lupino as Agnes Langley
 Howard Duff as Jim Hollis
 Robert Nichols as Orin
 Mary Shipp as Lorna Gale
 Ned Glass as Grocery Clerk
 Kitty McHugh as Landlady
 Lorna Thayer as Molly, Grocery Clerk
 Matt Dennis as himself

Reception
Time Out magazine (London) writes of the film, "This is gothic romance crossed with early-'50s noir, worth a look for the sake of the great Wong Howe. Grey-listed and taking what work he could get, he tackles even this B-picture for Monogram with unfailing artistry, creating images that are strong without being showy, atmospheric yet perfectly naturalistic."

References

External links
 
 
 
 
 Jennifer essay by Kimberly Lindbergs at TCM's Movie Morlocks

1953 films
1950s thriller films
Allied Artists films
American thriller films
American black-and-white films
Film noir
Films scored by Ernest Gold
Monogram Pictures films
Gothic fiction
1950s English-language films
1950s American films